The Anglican dioceses of Rwenzori are the Anglican presence in (roughly) the areas near the Rwenzori mountains; they are part of the Church of Uganda. The remaining dioceses of the Church are in the areas of Buganda, of Eastern Uganda, of Northern Uganda, and of Ankole and Kigezi.

Diocese of Rwenzori
The Diocese of Rwenzori was erected when the Diocese of Uganda split in five in 1960; Erica Sabiti became its first diocesan bishop, having served since earlier that year as suffragan bishop (in the Uganda diocese) for the Toro-Bunyoro-Mboga area.

Bishops of Rwenzori
1960–1972 (res.): Erica Sabiti (also Archbishop of Uganda, Rwanda and Burundi from 1966; resigned this See, remaining Archbishop and becoming Bishop of Kampala)
1967–1972: Yonasani Rwakaikara, assistant bishop
1972–1981: Yonasani Rwakaikara (translated to Bunyoro-Kitara)
1981–2000 (ret.): Eustace Kamanyire (formerly Principal of Bishop Tucker Theological College, Mukono)
?–2009: Benezeri Kisembo
2009–2010 (d.): Patrick Kyaligonza
8 May 2011present: Reuben Kisembo

Diocese of Bunyoro-Kitara
Erected from Rwenzori diocese, 1972.

Bishops of Bunyoro-Kitara
1972–1981: Yostus Ruhindi (also Yustasi; consecrated 6 August 1972 at Namirembe Cathedral; translated to North Kigezi)
1981–1989: Yonasani Rwakaikara (translated from Rwenzori)
1989–2002: Wilson Turumanya (Wilson Nkuna/Nkuuna Turumanya)
August 20022016: Nathan Kyamanywa
4 December 2016present: Sam Kahuma

Diocese of South Rwenzori
Erected from the Diocese of Rwenzori, 1984.

Bishops of South Rwenzori
19842003: Zebedee Kahangwa-Masereka
20032020: Jackson Nzerebende
2020present: Nason Baluku

Diocese of Masindi-Kitara
Erected from Bunyoro-Kitara diocese, 2004.

Bishop of Masindi-Kitara
2004–2012: Stanley Ntagali (became Archbishop of Uganda)
2012present: George Kasangaki (consecrated 25 November 2012, St Matthew's Cathedral, Masindi)

Diocese of East Rwenzori
Erected from the Diocese of Rwenzori, 2009.

Bishops of East Rwenzori
2009–2018: Edward Bamucwanira
7 January 2018present: George Turyasingura

Diocese of West Rwenzori
A new diocese split from Rwenzori diocese is proposed, and was considered in July 2019.

See also
 Anglican dioceses of Ankole and Kigezi
 Anglican dioceses of Buganda
 Anglican dioceses of Eastern Uganda
 Anglican dioceses of Northern Uganda
 List of Roman Catholic dioceses in Uganda

References

Church of Uganda